The Giluwe rat (Rattus giluwensis) is a species of rodent in the family Muridae.
It is found only in Papua New Guinea, on Mount Giluwe and the subalpine grasslands of the Kaijende Highlands.

References

Rattus
Rodents of Papua New Guinea
Mammals described in 1960
Taxonomy articles created by Polbot
Rodents of New Guinea